ʔEniyud (pronounced Enni-yoot), also known as Niut Mountain, is one summits of the Chilcotin Ranges subdivision of the Pacific Ranges of the Coast Mountains of southern British Columbia.

Name 
The name Niut Mountain was officially adopted on 5 October 1960 and on 11 June 2020, the official name became ʔEniyud as recommended by Tŝilhqot’in National Government, with support from the Cariboo Regional District, BC Parks, the Association of Canadian Mountain Guides, BC Mountaineering Club and Avalanche Canada.

The Niut Range takes its name from Niut Mountain.

See also
 Mountain peaks of Canada
 Mountain peaks of North America
 Geography of British Columbia

References

Three-thousanders of British Columbia
Chilcotin Ranges
Landforms of the Chilcotin
Range 2 Coast Land District